Grintovec is the highest mountain of the Kamnik–Savinja Alps, with an elevation of . It is a popular location for hiking, climbing and skiing. The first recorded ascent was in 1759 by the botanist Giovanni Antonio Scopoli.

It is the second most prominent peak in Slovenia after Triglav.

It is relatively easy to climb if you start from the lodge in the Kamnik Bistrica Valley, via the Zois Lodge at Kokra Saddle.

Routes 
 3h: From the Czech Lodge at Spodnje Ravni via Little Door Pass, then on the southeastern ridge Long Wall
 3h: From the Zois Lodge at Kokra Saddle via the Roof Slope, the southern top slope of Mount Grintovec.
 3½h: From the Czech Lodge at Spodnje Ravni via Mlinar Saddle on eastern ridge
 3½-4 h: From the Czech Lodge at Spodnje Ravni on the Dolci Notch Pass, then on the Šprem Route

References

External links
 
 Grintovec. Map and virtual panoramas. Burger.si
 Grintovec on hribi.net Route Description and Photos (slo)

Mountains of the Kamnik–Savinja Alps
Mountains of Upper Carniola
Two-thousanders of Slovenia